Lara Comi (born 18 February 1983) is an Italian politician, member of the European Parliament from 2009 to 2019, and again since 2022.

Education 

Lara Comi received a bachelor's degree in economics in 2005 from Università Cattolica del Sacro Cuore in Milan. In 2007 she earned a master's in economics from Università Commerciale Luigi Bocconi, also in Milan.

Career 
She held internships at the Uruguayan consulate in Italy and Beiersdorf Italy, and was a brand manager for Giochi Preziosi.

In the seventh European Parliament she was a member of the delegations for relations with Afghanistan (2009–10) and Latin America (2010–14), the delegation to the EU–Mexico Joint Parliamentary Committee (2010–14), and the Committee on the Internal Market and Consumer Protection (2012–14).

As of 16 November 2013, with the dissolution of the People of Freedom, she is a member of the re-formed Forza Italia.

In the European election of 2014, Comi retained her seat in North-West Italy, this time with 83,987 votes. She was chosen as vice-president of the European People's Party group for the eighth European Parliament. She serves on the Committee on the Internal Market and Consumer Protection and the delegation for relations with the United States.

Legal problems 
Lara Comi hired her mother as personal assistant at her office in the European Parliament and she was sanctioned for that legal problem.

References 

1983 births
Living people
The People of Freedom MEPs
MEPs for Italy 2009–2014
MEPs for Italy 2014–2019
21st-century women MEPs for Italy